Mauro Gerosa (born October 9, 1974, in Oggiono) is a former Italian racing cyclist.

Major results
2003
6th Firenze–Pistoia
2004
3rd Road race, National Road Championships
6th Grand Prix of Aargau Canton
10th Coppa Ugo Agostoni

Grand Tour results

Tour de France
2005: 137

Vuelta a España
2004: 95
2005: 103

Giro d'Italia
2000: 97
2001: 77 
2002: 102 
2003: 79 
2004: 62

References

1974 births
Living people
Italian male cyclists